Soritena is a monotypic moth genus in the family Erebidae. Its only species, Soritena habanera, is found on Cuba. Both the genus and species were first described by William Schaus in 1924.

References

Phaegopterina
Monotypic moth genera
Moths described in 1924
Moths of the Caribbean
Endemic fauna of Cuba